XHFI-TDT is the television call sign for the Televisa television station on virtual channel 2 in Chihuahua, Chihuahua, Mexico. The station repeats the Las Estrellas network.

History
XHFI received its concession on April 30, 1963, and signed on in 1964 as XERA-TV; the station broadcast on analog channel 11 and then moved to 5. XERA changed its calls to the current XHFI-TDT by 1969. It was the first television station in the city of Chihuahua. The station was partly local in the mornings until XHAUC-TV signed on in 1996. Digital transmissions began in 2013; the station shut off analog on December 31, 2015.

Digital television 
XHFI-TDT broadcasts on RF channel 26 (virtual channel 2). On January 1, 2019, it began carrying FOROtv as its second digital subchannel, relocated from XHCHZ-TDT upon the move of Televisa Chihuahua programming to 5.2.

Digital subchannels

Repeaters

|-

|}

References

External links

Las Estrellas transmitters
Mass media in Chihuahua City